Dayton is a city in Webster County, Iowa, United States. The population was 772 at the time of the 2020 census.

History
A post office called Dayton has been in operation since 1877. The city was named after Dayton, Ohio.

Geography
Dayton is located at  (42.262672, -94.069136).

Demographics

2010 census
As of the census of 2010, there were 837 people, 330 households, and 222 families living in the city. The racial makeup of the city was 98.7% White, 0.6% African American, 0.4% from other races, and 0.4% from two or more races. Hispanic or Latino of any race were 0.6% of the population.

There were 330 households, of which 33.6% had children under the age of 18 living with them, 51.8% were married couples living together, 9.1% had a female householder with no husband present, 6.4% had a male householder with no wife present, and 32.7% were non-families. 30.0% of all households were made up of individuals, and 16.7% had someone living alone who was 65 years of age or older. The average household size was 2.43 and the average family size was 2.95.

The median age in the city was 42.2 years. 26% of residents were under the age of 18; 6.7% were between the ages of 18 and 24; 22.2% were from 25 to 44; 23.3% were from 45 to 64; and 21.9% were 65 years of age or older. The gender makeup of the city was 50.9% male and 49.1% female.

2000 census
As of the census of 2000, there were 884 people, 354 households, and 235 families living in the city. The racial makeup of the city was 98.42% White, 0.11% African American, 0.11% Native American, 0.23% Asian, 0.45% from other races, and 0.68% from two or more races. Hispanic or Latino of any race were 0.34% of the population.

There were 354 households, out of which 29.9% had children under the age of 18 living with them, 53.4% were married couples living together, 9.3% had a female householder with no husband present, and 33.6% were non-families. 30.2% of all households were made up of individuals, and 15.5% had someone living alone who was 65 years of age or older. The average household size was 2.38 and the average family size was 2.91.

24.8% were under the age of 18, 7.6% from 18 to 24, 24.2% from 25 to 44, 18.1% from 45 to 64, and 25.3% were 65 years of age or older. The median age was 40 years. For every 100 females, there were 91.3 males. For every 100 females age 18 and over, there were 87.3 males.

The median income for a household in the city was $33,864, and the median income for a family was $38,698. Males had a median income of $30,952 versus $20,208 for females. The per capita income for the city was $15,714. About 13.9% of families and 11.5% of the population were below the poverty line, including 15.8% of those under age 18 and 6.1% of those age 65 or over.

Annual events 
Since 1937, Dayton has been the site of a rodeo on Labor Day weekend. It began with a pair of local cowboys and has grown to a National Championship Rodeo, sanctioned by the Professional Rodeo Cowboys Association. The rodeo features bareback riding, saddle bronc riding, bull riding, calf roping, team roping, steer wrestling, barrel racing, and the wild horse race. The rodeo has generated large crowds and high quality competitors. The rodeo features many types of domestic beers and American fare.

Education
Dayton is a part of the Southeast Webster-Grand Community School District, established on July 1, 2005 by the merger of the Grand Community School District and the Southeast Webster Community School District. It was previously served by the Southeast Webster Community School District, which was formed on July 1, 1991 with the merger of the Central Webster Community School District and the Dayton Community School District.

References

External links
 Dayton Rodeo Website

Cities in Iowa
Cities in Webster County, Iowa